Alexander Isak (born 21 September 1999) is a Swedish professional footballer who plays as a forward for Premier League club Newcastle United and the Sweden national team.

Starting off his professional career with AIK in 2016, Isak represented Borussia Dortmund and Willem II before signing with Real Sociedad in 2019. A full Swedish international since 2017, he has won more than 30 caps for his country, and represented the side at UEFA Euro 2020. He is the youngest ever goalscorer for both AIK and the Sweden national team.

Club career

Early life
Isak was born to Eritrean parents and raised in Solna Municipality, in central Stockholm County. He started playing for the youth team of one of the largest clubs in the area, the Allsvenskan team he supports, AIK, at age six.

Breakthrough at AIK
Isak made his first-team debut for AIK on 28 February 2016, appearing as a substitute in the 75th minute of the Swedish Cup away match against fourth-tier side Tenhults IF. At age 16, Isak scored a goal in the 6–0 victory.

On 7 April 2016, AIK head coach Andreas Alm included Isak in the starting lineup on matchday 2 of the Allsvenskan in an away fixture against Östersunds FK, alongside fellow young striker Carlos Strandberg. He secured the victory for his side, scoring the second goal in a 2–0 win, thus becoming the youngest scorer for AIK in Allsvenskan history at the age of 16 years and 199 days.

On 25 April, Isak scored his first goal at AIK's home ground, Friends Arena, opening the score in a 2–1 victory against IF Elfsborg.

On 3 May 2016, Isak signed his first professional contract through the end of the 2018 season, having impressed in his first few games, and establishing himself as a first-team regular. Between matchdays 8 and 9, head coach Alm was sacked, but Isak was confirmed in the lineup by new manager Rikard Norling.

On 21 September 2016, Isak's 17th birthday, he scored two critical goals in AIK's 3–0 derby win over arch-rivals Djurgårdens IF. He was later described by teammate Chinedu Obasi as "Sweden's new Zlatan Ibrahimović".

Borussia Dortmund

On 23 January 2017, Isak signed for Bundesliga club Borussia Dortmund on a long-term contract, lasting until the summer of 2022. The transfer fee was undisclosed, but reports suggested that it was set at €9 million, which would be the highest transfer fee ever paid for an Allsvenskan player. Before signing with Dortmund, Isak reportedly turned down a move to Real Madrid.

Isak made his first appearance for the club in a 3–0 cup win over Sportfreunde Lotte on 14 March 2017. Isak won his first medal with the club when Dortmund won the 2016–17 DFB-Pokal, only appearing once in the tournament, and not being in the squad for the final.

He scored his first competitive goal for Dortmund in a 2017–18 DFB-Pokal second round win against 1. FC Magdeburg on 24 October 2017, scoring the second goal in a 5–0 win.

Loan to Willem II
After making no appearances in the 2018–19 Bundesliga season for Borussia Dortmund, Isak was loaned to Dutch Eredivisie club Willem II. On 28 February 2019, he scored the equaliser and the winning penalty against AZ Alkmaar in the semi-finals of the KNVB Cup, helping Willem II reach the Dutch cup final for the first time since 2005. On 30 March 2019, he became the first player ever to score three penalties in an Eredivisie match, in a 3–2 win against Fortuna Sittard. On 14 April 2019, Isak became the first foreign-born player in the Eredivisie to score 12 goals in his first 12 league games.

Real Sociedad

2019–20 season 
On 12 June 2019, Isak signed a five-year deal with Real Sociedad, worth £988,000 a year, or £19000 per week, joining the La Liga club on 1 July 2019, in which he scored his first goal in his first game. He strongly continued the pre-season, scoring four goals in five games. Isak scored his first competitive goal for Real Sociedad in a 3–1 La Liga win against RCD Espanyol on 22 September 2019. On 6 February, Isak scored two goals and made one assist in the Copa del Rey quarter-final against Real Madrid. On 9 February, he scored the winning goal in the Basque derby against Athletic Bilbao.

On 3 April 2021, Isak won his first silverware with the club when he started and played in 89 minutes of the 2020 Copa del Rey Final in a 1–0 win against Athletic Bilbao, helping Real Sociedad win the 2019–20 Copa del Rey.

2020–21 season 
He scored his first hat-trick for the club on 21 February 2021 in a 4–0 league win against Deportivo Alavés, becoming the first Swedish player to score a La Liga hat-trick since Henry "Garvis" Carlsson did the same for Atletico Madrid in 1949.

2020–21 season

Isak scored 10 goals in all competitions in this season, where Real Sociedad ultimately finished 6th in La Liga.

Newcastle United

2022–23 season
On 26 August 2022, Isak signed for Premier League club Newcastle United on a long-term contract for an undisclosed fee, reported to be more than $70 million, which would be a club transfer record. On 31 August, he scored a goal on his debut and was named man of the match in a 2–1 defeat against Liverpool at Anfield. 

Following a 1–1 draw with Bournemouth, where he scored a penalty, Isak was sidelined for 16 competitive matches due to a hamstring injury, he returned to the squad to play the first half in the FA Cup third round tie to Sheffield Wednesday. On 15 January 2023, he scored his first goal after the injury in the 89th minute in a 1–0 victory over Fulham. Isak scored his first brace for Newcastle on 17 March 2023 in a 2-1 away victory against Nottingham Forest, the second goal being a penalty in stoppage time to win the game.

International career
Isak played for youth Swedish national teams in the U-16 to U-21 categories. He was called up to the Sweden national team for the friendly matches against Ivory Coast on 8 January 2017 and Slovakia on 12 January. He made his debut against the Ivory Coast, coming on for Per Frick in the 62nd minute of a 1–2 loss. He started the second game against Slovakia, scoring the first goal in a 6–0 win in the 19th minute, becoming the youngest goalscorer ever in the history of the Sweden national team.

On 23 March 2019, Isak made his first competitive appearance for Sweden, when he replaced Robin Quaison in the 88th minute in a UEFA Euro 2020 qualifying game against Romania, which Sweden won 2–1.

Isak scored his first competitive goal for Sweden on 7 June 2019, when Sweden beat Malta in a UEFA Euro 2020 qualifying game at Friends Arena in Stockholm, Sweden. Isak scored the last goal in a 3–0 win.

Isak was called up for a major tournament for the first time when he was included in Sweden's 26-man squad for UEFA Euro 2020.

Career statistics

Club

International

Scores and results list Sweden's goal tally first

Honours
Real Sociedad
Copa del Rey: 2019–20

Newcastle United
EFL Cup runner-up: 2022–23

Individual
Allsvenskan Newcomer of the Year: 2016
Allsvenskan Player of the Month: September 2016
Copa del Rey top scorer: 2019–20
Eredivisie Talent of the Month: March 2019
Fotbollsgalan Forward of the Year: 2021

References

External links

1999 births
Living people
People from Solna Municipality
Footballers from Stockholm
Swedish footballers
Association football forwards
AIK Fotboll players
Willem II (football club) players
Borussia Dortmund players
Borussia Dortmund II players
Real Sociedad footballers
Newcastle United F.C. players
Allsvenskan players
Regionalliga players
Bundesliga players
Eredivisie players
La Liga players
Premier League players
Sweden youth international footballers
Sweden under-21 international footballers
Sweden international footballers
UEFA Euro 2020 players
Swedish expatriate footballers
Expatriate footballers in England
Expatriate footballers in Germany
Expatriate footballers in the Netherlands
Expatriate footballers in Spain
Swedish expatriate sportspeople in England
Swedish expatriate sportspeople in Germany
Swedish expatriate sportspeople in the Netherlands
Swedish expatriate sportspeople in Spain
Swedish people of Eritrean descent
Swedish sportspeople of African descent